Her Accidental Husband is a 1923 American silent romance film directed by Dallas M. Fitzgerald and starring Miriam Cooper, Forrest Stanley, and Mitchell Lewis. It was released by a forerunner of Columbia Pictures.

Cast
 Miriam Cooper as Rena Goring 
 Forrest Stanley as Gordon Gray 
 Mitchell Lewis as Old Blind Goring 
 Richard Tucker as Paul Dupré 
 Kate Lester as Mrs. Gray 
 Maude Wayne as Vera Hampton

References

Bibliography
 Munden, Kenneth White. The American Film Institute Catalog of Motion Pictures Produced in the United States, Part 1. University of California Press, 1997.

External links

1923 films
1923 romantic drama films
American silent feature films
American romantic drama films
Films directed by Dallas M. Fitzgerald
American black-and-white films
Columbia Pictures films
1920s English-language films
1920s American films
Silent romantic drama films
Silent American drama films